Moses Raine (born 7 August 1984) is a playwright and screenwriter. He was born in Oxford and is the son of the poet and critic Craig Raine and Ann Pasternak Slater; he is also a grand nephew of the Russian novelist Boris Pasternak.
He attended the Dragon School and St. Edward’s School, in Oxford.

Life and career
In 2004 he was shortlisted for the Verity Bargate Award for his collection of short plays, The Survival Handbook. His next play, Shrieks of Laughter, was commissioned as part of Soho Theatre's Writers' Attachment Programme, and premiered at the Soho Theatre in 2006. In The Observer (21 May 2006) Susannah Clapp wrote, of both:

"Moses Raine wasn't born when Cheek by Jowl was founded, but he's already written a spellbinding clutch of plays: they are like no one else's."

In May 2014 Raine’s Donkey Heart premiered at the Old Red Lion Theater, Islington.

This ‘big-hearted new work’ was praised by David Benedict in Variety (19 May 2014) as ‘consistently surprising  … highly entertaining … The energy and warmth of this unexpected winner deserve far wider attention and exposure.’

‘This absorbing portrait of contemporary Russian life is full of original, quirkily charming humour’
Henry Hitchings, Evening Standard (12 May 2014)

Moses Raine is currently working on a film adaptation of Ian McEwan’s short story, "Conversation with a Cupboard Man".

References

1984 births
Living people
People educated at The Dragon School
People educated at St Edward's School, Oxford
English dramatists and playwrights
English male dramatists and playwrights
English people of Russian-Jewish descent
Jewish dramatists and playwrights
Pasternak family